Louis Stephen Marone (December 3, 1945 – November 27, 2015) was an American professional baseball player, a left-handed relief pitcher who appeared in 30 Major League Baseball games as a member of the 1969–1970 Pittsburgh Pirates. He was the cousin of former major league pitcher John D'Acquisto.

Career

Marone was recalled by the Pirates in May 1969, his fifth professional season, after a strong early season for the Double-A York Pirates, where he won two of three decisions and posted six saves and an earned run average of 0.93 in 17 games and 29 innings pitched, all in relief. As a Pittsburgh rookie, he appeared in 29 games  allowing 24 hits and 13 bases on balls in 34 innings. Of the ten earned runs Marone allowed in 1969, six came in two rough outings against the St. Louis Cardinals. One final appearance in early 1970, also against the Cardinals, concluded his MLB career. Altogether he split his two decisions, and gave up 26 hits in 37 innings during his big league career, with 25 strikeouts and no saves.

Marone's eight-year pro career concluded in minor league baseball, in the Pirates' organization, in 1972.

References

Further reading
 Musick, Phil. "The Sound of Musick: Marone's Stage". The Pittsburgh Press. August 19, 1969.
 Feeney, Charley. "Roamin' Around: Some Shorties". The Pittsburgh Post-Gazette. April 24, 1970.
 Smizik, Bob. "Marone: It's Now Or Never; Making Pitch To Be Buc". The Pittsburgh Press. September 26, 1972.

External links

1945 births
2015 deaths
Asheville Tourists players
Baseball players from San Diego
Batavia Pirates players
Charleston Charlies players
Clinton Pilots players
Columbus Jets players
Major League Baseball pitchers
Pittsburgh Pirates players
Raleigh Pirates players
Salem Rebels players
Sherbrooke Pirates players
Waterbury Pirates players
York Pirates players